Bikmetovo (Bikmät) is a rural locality (a selo) in Chekmagushevsky District, Bashkortostan, Russia. The population was 109 as of 2010. There are 3 streets.

Geography 
Bikmetovo is located 15 km northwest of Chekmagush (the district's administrative centre) by road. Starye Chupty is the nearest rural locality.

References 

Rural localities in Chekmagushevsky District